Proverbs 5 is the fifth chapter of the Book of Proverbs in the Hebrew Bible or the Old Testament of the Christian Bible. The book is a compilation of several wisdom literature collections, with the heading in 1:1 may be intended to regard Solomon as the traditional author of the whole book, but the dates of the individual collections are difficult to determine, and the book probably obtained its final shape in the post-exilic period. This chapter is a part of the first collection of the book, focusing on "the dangers of the strange woman".

Text
The original text is written in Hebrew language. This chapter is divided into 23 verses.

Textual witnesses
Some early manuscripts containing the text of this chapter in Hebrew are of the Masoretic Text, which includes the Aleppo Codex (10th century), and Codex Leningradensis (1008). 

There is also a translation into Koine Greek known as the Septuagint, made in the last few centuries BC; some extant ancient manuscripts of this version include Codex Vaticanus (B; B; 4th century), Codex Sinaiticus (S; BHK: S; 4th century), and Codex Alexandrinus (A; A; 5th century).

Analysis
This chapter belongs to a section regarded as the first collection in the book of Proverbs (comprising Proverbs 1–9), known as "Didactic discourses". The Jerusalem Bible describes chapters 1–9 as a prologue of the chapters 10–22:16, the so-called "[actual] proverbs of Solomon", as "the body of the book". 

This chapter has the following structure: 
First exhortation of discretion (verses 1, 2) followed by an explanation on how to avoid seduction (verses 3–6)
Second exhortation to prevention (verses 7, 8) then an explanation that obedience will avoid ruin and regret (verses 9–14)
Warning against sharing love with strangers (15–17) but to find it at home (18–23).

Sub-titled "The Peril of Adultery" in the New King James Version, this chapter contains the first of three poems on the "forbidden woman", the “stranger” outside the social boundaries of Israel; the other two are Proverbs 6:20–35 and Proverbs 7. Verse 5 suggests that the woman is "as bitter as wormwood", a comparison used several times in the Hebrew Bible, by the prophets Jeremiah and Amos, also in Deuteronomy.

Avoid the seductress (5:1–14)
The passage continues the instruction against the "loose woman" (or "seductress") introduced in Proverbs 2:16–19 (cf. Proverbs 6:20–35; 7:1–27), starting with a typical appeal to the child to listen carefully to receive the necessary knowledge for avoiding entanglement with her (verses 1–2). The seductress makes use of her natural sex appeal (cf. Proverbs 6:25, but mainly relying on her seductive speech (cf. Proverbs 7:14–20), which is compared with honey for sweetness (cf. Proverbs 16:24; Judges 14:8, 14; bride's kisses in Song 4:11) and oil for smoothness (verse 8; flattery in Proverbs 29:5; hypocrisy in Psalm 5:9). A contrast is given in verses 3–4 between honey (sweet) and wormwood (bitter; Jeremiah 9:15; Amos 5:7) and between oil (smooth) and double-edged sword (sharp; Psalm 55:21). However, any promise of pleasure and enjoyment, would bring different reality ('in the end'; verse 4) as the seductress travels the path to Sheol (verse 5; cf. 2:18–19; 7:27) with 'the unsteady steps of a drunkard' ('wander'; cf. Isaiah 28:7) staggering from one lover to another not knowing that she brings harm to herself or to her victims (cf. Proverbs 7:21-7; 30:20). 

A second appeal for attentiveness (verse 7) is followed by succinct advice (cf. Proverbs 1:15; 4:15) and expositions of the consequences of liaison with her (verses 9–14): the loss of dignity and honor (verse 9), of hard-earned wealth (verse 10), and of vigor and health (verse 11); all of which is the antithesis of Wisdom's benediction (Proverbs 3:13-18). Rejecting wise counsel or learning the lesson too late would produce a lamentation in verses 12–14 (cf. Proverbs 1:24–28).

Verse 1
My son, attend to my wisdom,
and bow your ear to my understanding,
"Bow": or "incline" to "listen carefully"

Verse 2
that you may keep discretion,and your lips may guard knowledge.Verse 7Wisdom is the principal thing;Therefore get wisdom. And in all your getting, get understanding.}}
Aitken stresses the need to acquire wisdom "at all costs", and the Jerusalem Bible advises that "one must first realise that it is essential to have it and that it demands self-sacrifice". Similarly the modern World English Bible's translation advises, Yes, though it costs all your possessions, get understanding.

Be faithful to your wife (5:15–23)
This passage more specifically address married men, mainly advising that the best way of avoiding the temptation of the seductress is that he remain faithful to his wife and derive sexual satisfaction from her, using the imagery of water, fountain, springs and streams to enjoy and not be wasted (cf. Song 4:12, 15). A husband should always place an image of his wife as a 'graceful doe', a symbol of her beauty (verse 18; cf. Song 2:7). Verse 21 reminds the husband of the 'scrutinizing eyes of the Lord' (cf. Proverbs 15:3; Job 31:4; 34:21) and his guardianship of the moral order, and that the consequence of indiscipline and folly would be 'reaping what has been sown' (cf. Proverbs 1:19; 2:20–22), and like a man threading a noose around his own neck or a senseless bird ensnared in the net (cf. Proverbs 1:17-19).

Verse 18Let your fountain be blessed,and rejoice with the wife of your youth."Blessed": from the passive participle form of the Hebrew word , barakh'', meaning that  the sexual delight is God-given and endowed with fruitfulness, that it would fulfill God's intention.
"The wife of your youth": refers to the age in which a man married his wife: “the wife you married in your youth” (cf. NCV, CEV); the temporal genitive form of the word "youth" is supported by similar constructions in parallel passages (cf. Proverbs 2:17; Malachi 2:14).

See also

Related Bible parts: Proverbs 1, Proverbs 2, Proverbs 7, Proverbs 9, Proverbs 15, Song of Songs 2, Song of Songs 4

References

Sources

External links
 Jewish translations:
 Mishlei - Proverbs - Chapter 5 (Judaica Press) translation [with Rashi's commentary] at Chabad.org
 Christian translations:
 Online Bible at GospelHall.org (ESV, KJV, Darby, American Standard Version, Bible in Basic English)
 Book of Proverbs Chapter 5 King James Version
  Various versions

05